Péter Hornyák (born 4 October 1995) is a Hungarian handball player for Balatonfüredi KSE and the Hungarian national team.

Career

Club
In 2011, Péter Hornyák made his debut in Dunaferr Alexandra among adults in Nemzeti Bajnokság I. He then spent two seasons at Balatonfüredi KSE, where he was given more and more opportunities to play. At the age of 18, he was contracted abroad and certified for the German second division team of TUSEM Essen. Here he soon became the team's main man, and he was the team's number one penalty shooter. They were also satisfied with his performance at the club, but after two seasons he was confirmed again to Hungary, the Csurgói KK, mainly due to his homesickness. In both of his seasons in Csurgói KK, he reached the third round of the EHF Cup qualifiers with his team. From the autumn of 2017 he became a player of Balatonfüredi KSE again. He spent two seasons with the Balaton shore team, and from the summer of 2019 he continued his career with Grundfos Tatabánya KC. On September 25, 2021, he suffered a cruciate ligament rupture in the SBS-Eger-Grundfos Tatabánya KC match.

National team
In the Hungarian national team in 2015 he got a chance in the last two matches of the European Championship qualifying series, and then, after the successful qualification, the first right winger of the national team, Péter Gulyás, was injured shortly before the European Championship, Hornyák took his place in the framework of the 2016 European Men's Handball Championship. He represented Hungary at the 2018 European Men's Handball Championship, 2019 World Men's Handball Championship And 2020 European Men's Handball Championship.

Honours

Club
Balatonfüredi KSE
Nemzeti Bajnokság I
 : 2012, 2021
Magyar Kupa
: 2018, 2019

Individual
 Hungarian Youth Handballer of the Year: 2012

References

External links

SportTál

1995 births
Living people
Hungarian male handball players
Sportspeople from Debrecen
Expatriate handball players
Hungarian expatriate sportspeople in Germany